L'Istituto Statale della Ss. Annunziata (English: The Ss. Annunziata Boarding School) was the first female boarding school in Florence, founded for the daughters of Marquis Gino Capponi. The Institute was created in 1823, to educate aristocratic and noble girls, under the patronage of Maria Anna of Saxony and Leopold II, Grand Duke of Tuscany. The original building was in the via della Scala, Florence. In 1865 it moved to the Villa del Poggio Imperiale overlooking Florence where it remains in situ today. The school has a Brother establishment in Prato, Collegio Cicognini where cultural figures Curzio Malaparte and D'Annunzio attended.

The school is subdivided into a mixed Elementary, Middle, and Upper School.
The Elementary school is an Italian-German school, teaching children in Italian, German and English. The Middle school teaches children predominantly in Italian and English, with the introduction of Latin and the option of Ancient Greek.

The Upper School, which is five years, is subdivided into Scientific, Linguistic, and European Classic schools. Students start at 14 years old. 
The Linguists, focusses on German, Italian and English as well as the core subjects. Whilst the Scientific, promotes the sciences; Biology, Physics, Chemistry, Geology, Philosophy, History. Whereas the European Classic, orientated towards Law, Economics, Italian, German, Ancient Greek and Latin. The boarding is still private but follows the more demanding state curriculum.

As rooms are limited within the Medici house boarding is reserved for only for approximately 80 girls. Girls come predominantly from all over Italy but nevertheless, there are few international students. Girls are called "Poggioline".

Notable alumni 
Dacia Maraini - Italian writer
Princess Marie-José of Belgium - last Queen of Italy
Edda Mussolini - eldest child of Benito Mussolini

See also 
Villa del Poggio Imperiale

References

External links 

School website and photographs of the Villa
Website of the Associazione Poggio Imperiale
Website of the Museo del Poggio Imperiale

Private schools in Italy
Girls' schools in Italy
Schools in Florence
Educational institutions established in 1823
1823 establishments in Italy